Michael Zapcic, often referred to as Mike Zapcic or Chief, is a podcaster and cast member of the AMC reality TV show Comic Book Men with Kevin Smith.

Early life
Inspired by Dr. Seuss books at age three, Zapcic later became interested in comic books of all variety and acquired an extensive knowledge in that area. After going to culinary school and working as a cook, he was hired by Walt Flanagan to work in Kevin Smith's comic book store Jay and Silent Bob's Secret Stash in Red Bank, New Jersey.

Career
When the podcast Tell 'Em Steve-Dave!—hosted by: Bryan Johnson, Walt Flanagan, and Brian Quinn—spawned the television reality show Comic Book Men in 2012, Mike Zapcic became a main cast member.

In 2014 he started a podcast of his own together with his partner and colleague Ming Chen. The weekly show I Sell Comics is hosted on the SModcast Podcast Network and deals with news and developments in the comic book world, as well as general topics.

Subsequently, Chen and Zapcic opened a podcast studio named A Shared Universe PodcaStudio in Eatontown, New Jersey.

Personal life 
Zapcic lives with his wife Julia and their two sons in Long Branch, New Jersey.

Filmography
Jay & Silent Bob's Super Groovy Cartoon Movie (2013) (Voice) as Bank Robber Cop 2
Shooting Clerks (2016) as Comic Book Dave
Burn in Hell (2018)
Jay and Silent Bob Reboot (2019) as himself

Television
 Comic Book Men (2012-2018) (Himself)

References

External links

 
 AMC official Comic Book Men site
 I Sell Comics! official site
 Zapcic's Website

Living people
Male actors from New Jersey
American male television actors
Year of birth missing (living people)
Place of birth missing (living people)
American podcasters
People from Long Branch, New Jersey